The 2009–10 Hong Kong Football Association First Division League (known as HKFA bma First Division League for sponsorship reasons) was the 98th top tier football league of Hong Kong. Because of the renovation of Mong Kok Stadium which will last for two league seasons, the current First Division League has allocated eight stadia for the eleven participating teams to play their home games.

The inaugural match was held between South China and Tai Chung on 6 September 2009. It was the first time since 1987–88 season that the inaugural match was not played between the former season champion and runner-up.

Hong Kong Football Association disqualified Tuen Mun Progoal on 27 November 2009 due to Tuen Mun Progoal defaulting on labour insurance.

The title was won by South China, their fourth title in a row. Happy Valley and Shatin were relegated at the end of the season. This is the first ever relegation for Happy Valley and came in their 60th anniversary season. The players from Happy Valley and Fourway Rangers were involved in a match-fixing scandal.

League table

Results

 All times are Hong Kong Time (UTC+8).

Round 1

Round 2

Round 3

Round 4

Round 5

Round 6

Round 7

Round 8

Round 9

Round 10

Round 11

Round 12

Round 13

Round 14

Round 15

Round 16

Round 17

Round 18

Round 19

Round 20

Stadia

 Since the Hong Kong Stadium held 2009 East Asian Games in December and 2010 Hong Kong Sevens in March, Kitchee and South China used Siu Sai Wan Sports Ground sometimes after December.

 NT Realty Wofoo Tai Po use Tseung Kwan O Sports Ground for 2010 AFC Cup due to Tai Po Sports Ground failed the criteria set by Asian Football Confederation.

 Sham Shui Po Sports Ground is the home stadium of Kitchee in later of season.

Top scorers

Only players scored ≥6 is shown.

Records

Team records
As at the match played on 2 January 2010
 Highest Scoring Match: TSW Pegasus 9–1 Tuen Mun Progoal (Round 6)
 Biggest Goal Difference: TSW Pegasus 9–1 Tuen Mun Progoal (Round 6)
 Biggest Home Victory: TSW Pegasus 9–1 Tuen Mun Progoal (Round 6)
 Biggest Home Defeat: Tuen Mun Progoal 1–9 NT Realty Wofoo Tai Po (Round 5)
 Most Wins in a row: South China 4 ;6 September 2009 – 15 December 2009
 Longest Undefeated Steak: TSW Pegasus 4 ; 18 October 2009 – 19 December 2009;
 Most Draws in a Row: Citizen 2 – 12 September 2009 – 27 September 2009;
 Longest Losing Streak: Tuen Mun Progoal 5 ; 20 September 2009 – 25 October 2009
 Longest Winless Streak: Tuen Mun Progoal 5 ; 20 September 2009 – 25 October 2009
 Highest Attendance: 5,442 Kitchee 2–1 South China (Round 6)) @ Hong Kong Stadium
 Lowest Attendance: 132 Tuen Mun Progoal 1–9 NT Realty Wofoo Tai Po (Round 5) @ Tsing Yi Sports Ground
 Highest Gate Receipt: $159,740 Kitchee 2–1 South China (Round 6))
 Lowest Gate Receipt: $1,780 (Tuen Mun Progoal 1–9 NT Realty Wofoo Tai Po (Round 5))
 Average Attendance: 770
 Average Goals: 3.52 goals

Individual records
 Most Goals in a match: Sandro of Citizen – 5 (Citizen 7–0 Happy Valley (Round 6))
 Fastest Goal : 2' Chan Yiu Lun of Sun Hei (Sun Hei 2–3 NT Realty Wofoo Tai Po (Round 2))

References

External links
Fixtures – bma 1st Division Football League, by HKFA

Hong Kong First Division League seasons
1
Hong Kong